.223 usually refers to the .223 Remington cartridge.

It may also refer to:
 .223 MINISAS, a cartridge for close-quarter battle use
 .223 Winchester Super Short Magnum, a cartridge based on the Winchester Short Magnum case
 .223 Wylde chamber, a hybrid rifle chamber designed to allow .22 caliber barrels to safely fire either .223 Remington or 5.56×45mm NATO ammunition

See also
 223 (number)